Illinois Route 184 is a  state road in the southern portion of the U.S. state of Illinois located entirely within Franklin County. It runs from Illinois Route 149 in Royalton north to Illinois Route 14 in Mulkeytown. Route 184 is maintained by the Illinois Department of Transportation.

Route description 
Route 184 begins at an intersection with Route 149 in Six Mile Township north of Royalton. The route continues north through farmland, passing occasional buildings. It meets County Route 14 before intersecting County Route 30 at the border of Tyrone Township. Route 184 continues north to Mulkeytown, where it terminates at Illinois Route 14; the road continues northward as County Route 38. Route 184 is a two-lane surface road for its entire length.

History 
Route 184 was established in 1924 along its current route. It was first marked on the 1929 Illinois highway map.

Major intersections

References

External links
Illinois Highways Page: Routes 181 thru 200

184
Transportation in Franklin County, Illinois